Nathalie Dechy and Mara Santangelo were the defending champions, but Dechy retired in 2009 and Santangelo chose not to compete this year.
Alizé Cornet and Vania King defeated Alla Kudryavtseva and Anastasia Rodionova in the final 3–6, 6–4, [10–7].

Seeds

Draw

Draw

References
Main Draw

Internationaux de Strasbourg - Doubles
Internationaux de Strasbourg
2010 in French tennis